Dena Amy Kaplan (born 20 January 1989) is a South African-born Australian actress, singer, dancer, and DJ. She is best known for her role as Abigail Armstrong in Dance Academy.

Life and career 
Kaplan was born in Johannesburg, South Africa. Her mother and grandmother were both ballet dancers. Kaplan's father was a musician and her grandfather was an actor. Dena comes from a Jewish family. She has an older sister Gemma-Ashley Kaplan and a younger sister Ariel Kaplan, who played Lisa Atwood #2 on The Saddle Club. Kaplan moved to Australia in 1996, at age seven. After watching Gemma taking ballet lessons Dena followed in her footsteps.

Kaplan attended Mount Scopus Memorial College and had dance training at numerous schools, including Australian Ballet School, Jane Moore Academy of Ballet and City Dance Centre. She first appeared onstage alongside David Campbell in The Production Company's Carousel, playing Louise, a non-singing solo ballet part in the second act of the show. Her second major appearance was as a dancer/singer in Disney's musical production of The Lion King. She moved to New York City to study at the Ailey School and Broadway Dance Center.

Her first television role was in 2005 on the Network Ten spy series Scooter: Secret Agent as one of the party girls. In 2007, she appeared as Deborah Statesman in an episode of Australian police drama City Homicide. In 2009, she played Keli in an episode of Flight Of The Conchords and starred in the film In Her Skin alongside Rebecca Gibney. She was then cast in the series "Dance Academy" and in the same year was cast as Stephanie Wolfe in City Homicide. In 2011, Kaplan starred as the love interest in Chris Sebastian's music video for "Flow". During 2013 she was cast in the role of Sarah Brennen in Camp. A TV series that was set to star Gemma, Dena, and Ariel was workshopped.

Dena Kaplan is an ambassador for Soi Dog Foundation and together with her sisters, she is an ambassador for the Australian Cervical Cancer Foundation.

Kaplan lives in Sydney, Australia. 

In December 2022, Kaplan announced her pregnancy via her instagram page.

Discography 
Dena Amy - Wait For You // 2016
Dena Amy ft. London Topaz - Your Eyes // 2017
Dena Amy ft. Kyle Waston - Diamonds Elle Skies' // 2017
Dena Amy - Jol // 2018

Filmography

References

External links 

1989 births
Australian female dancers
Australian film actresses
Australian Jews
Australian television actresses
Jewish Australian actresses
Living people
People from Johannesburg
South African emigrants to Australia
South African Jews
21st-century Australian actresses
Australian women pop singers
21st-century Australian singers
21st-century Australian women singers